Glenanne may refer to:

 Glenanne Hockey Club, a field hockey club based in Tallaght, South Dublin, Ireland. 
 Glenanne Loughgilly Tramway, a defunct tram service in County Armagh, Ireland
 Glenanne, a village near Mountnorris, County Armagh, Northern Ireland   
 Glenanne gang, a secret informal alliance of Ulster loyalists
 Glenanne barracks bombing, a large truck bomb attack carried out by the Provisional IRA against a British Army base

See also
 Fiona Glenanne, a fictional character in the TV series Burn Notice
 Glenanna, a historic home located at Floyd, Floyd County, Virginia.